Gustavia acuminata is a species of woody plant in the family Lecythidaceae. It is found in Brazil and Venezuela. It is threatened by habitat loss.

References

acuminata
Flora of Brazil
Flora of Venezuela
Vulnerable plants
Taxonomy articles created by Polbot